John Frandsen may refer to:

John Frandsen (composer), Danish composer and organist
John Frandsen (conductor), Danish conductor
John Frandsen (footballer), Danish footballer